Brachypnoea is a genus of leaf beetles in the subfamily Eumolpinae. It is mostly found in the Neotropical realm, though there are also eight known species in the Nearctic realm.

The genus was originally named Noda, named by Chevrolat in Dejean's Catalogue in 1836. However, this was preoccupied by Noda Schellenberg, 1803, a genus in Diptera. Two replacement names were made for Noda: Brachypnoea, by Gistel in 1848, and Nodonota by Édouard Lefèvre in 1885. Since Brachypnoea was published first, it has priority over Nodonota.

Species
These species belong to the genus Brachypnoea:

 Brachypnoea acuminata (Lefèvre, 1885)
 Brachypnoea acutangula (Jacoby, 1890)
 Brachypnoea angulicollis (Lefèvre, 1876)
 Brachypnoea arbustorum Bechyné & Bechyné, 1961
 Brachypnoea argentinensis (Jacoby, 1904)
 Brachypnoea atra (Harold, 1875)
 Brachypnoea atra adequata (Bechyné, 1955)
 Brachypnoea atra atra (Harold, 1875)
 Brachypnoea atra dislocata (Bechyné, 1953)
 Brachypnoea atra mosqueya Bechyné, 1997
 Brachypnoea aurulenta (Lefèvre, 1876)
 Brachypnoea balyi (Jacoby, 1878)
 Brachypnoea bebedera (Bechyné, 1955)
 Brachypnoea bella (Jacoby, 1890)
 Brachypnoea bicallosa (Jacoby, 1881)
 Brachypnoea boggianii (Jacoby, 1899)
 Brachypnoea boggianii boggianii (Jacoby, 1899)
 Brachypnoea boggianii laplatensis (Bechyné, 1954)
 Brachypnoea bogotana (Harold, 1874)
 Brachypnoea boliviana (Jacoby, 1899)
 Brachypnoea bowdichi (Bechyné, 1949)
 Brachypnoea callosa (Lefèvre, 1878)
 Brachypnoea carpintera (Bechyné, 1955)
 Brachypnoea chalcea (Lefèvre, 1878)
 Brachypnoea chontalensis (Jacoby, 1890)
 Brachypnoea clypealis (Horn, 1892)
 Brachypnoea colaspisformis (Bechyné, 1949)
 Brachypnoea colonensis (Bechyné, 1955)
 Brachypnoea columbina (Lefèvre, 1878)
 Brachypnoea congregata (Jacoby, 1890)
 Brachypnoea consonaria (Bechyné, 1951)
 Brachypnoea convexa (Say, 1824)
 Brachypnoea coroicensis (Bechyné, 1951)
 Brachypnoea costipennis (Lefèvre, 1875)
 Brachypnoea cretifera (Lefèvre, 1875)
 Brachypnoea cribellata (Jacoby, 1881)
 Brachypnoea cyanella (Jacoby, 1890)
 Brachypnoea cyanescens (Weise, 1921)
 Brachypnoea denticollis (Jacoby, 1899)
 Brachypnoea dispersa (Jacoby, 1881)
 Brachypnoea distincta (Jacoby, 1881)
 Brachypnoea doryphthalma (Bechyné, 1954)
 Brachypnoea doryphthalma doryphthalma (Bechyné, 1954)
 Brachypnoea doryphthalma quimensis Bechyné, 1958
 Brachypnoea edura (Weise, 1921)
 Brachypnoea elongata (Jacoby, 1890)
 Brachypnoea eulina Bechyné & Bechyné, 1961
 Brachypnoea exilis (Erichson, 1848)
 Brachypnoea exilis debilis Bechyné, 1997
 Brachypnoea exilis exilis (Erichson, 1848)
 Brachypnoea exilis grita (Bechyné, 1955)
 Brachypnoea exilis propinqua (Lefèvre, 1875)
 Brachypnoea exilis tuberculata (Lefèvre, 1875)
 Brachypnoea fallaciosa (Weise, 1921)
 Brachypnoea fastidita (Jacoby, 1899)
 Brachypnoea filicornis (Weise, 1921)
 Brachypnoea floricola (Bechyné, 1949)
 Brachypnoea freyi (Bechyné, 1951)
 Brachypnoea grenadensis (Jacoby, 1897)
 Brachypnoea hondurensis (Jacoby, 1890)
 Brachypnoea humeralis (Latreille, 1833)
 Brachypnoea humlis (Erichson, 1848)
 Brachypnoea igneicollis (Jacoby, 1881)
 Brachypnoea imitans (Jacoby, 1890)
 Brachypnoea insignis (Lefèvre, 1885)
 Brachypnoea interrupta (Weise, 1921)
 Brachypnoea irazuensis (Jacoby, 1881)
 Brachypnoea junonis (Bechyné, 1952)
 Brachypnoea laeta (Lefèvre, 1878)
 Brachypnoea landolti (Lefèvre, 1878)
 Brachypnoea lateralis (Jacoby, 1881)
 Brachypnoea lateralis jaliscensis (Bechyné, 1953)
 Brachypnoea lateralis lateralis (Jacoby, 1881)
 Brachypnoea lecontei E. Riley, S. Clark & Seeno, 2003
 Brachypnoea lefevrei (Jacoby, 1878)
 Brachypnoea lefevrei boucardi (Jacoby, 1878)
 Brachypnoea lefevrei lefevrei (Jacoby, 1878)
 Brachypnoea longicornis (Bechyné, 1953)
 Brachypnoea lugens (Weise, 1921)
 Brachypnoea luteipes (Lefèvre, 1878)
 Brachypnoea margaretae (Schultz, 1980)
 Brachypnoea medellina (Lefèvre, 1878)
 Brachypnoea meligethoides (Weise, 1921)
 Brachypnoea meridensis (Bechyné, 1953)
 Brachypnoea metallica (Jacoby, 1890)
 Brachypnoea micromela (Bechyné, 1953)
 Brachypnoea mimas (Bechyné, 1955)
 Brachypnoea miribella (Bechyné, 1951)
 Brachypnoea mixiollensis (Bechyné, 1954)
 Brachypnoea modesta (Lefèvre, 1878)
 Brachypnoea modesta animatoria (Bechyné, 1953)
 Brachypnoea modesta modesta (Lefèvre, 1878)
 Brachypnoea modesta parvula (Jacoby, 1890)
 Brachypnoea moerens (Weise, 1921)
 Brachypnoea moesta (Weise, 1921)
 Brachypnoea nana (Klug, 1829)
 Brachypnoea nicandra (Bechyné, 1953)
 Brachypnoea nigra (Weise, 1921)
 Brachypnoea obliterata (Jacoby, 1890)
 Brachypnoea ocanana (Lefèvre, 1878)
 Brachypnoea opaca (Jacoby, 1881)
 Brachypnoea opacicollis (Jacoby, 1890)
 Brachypnoea ovoidea (Bechyné, 1953)
 Brachypnoea palmarensis (Bechyné, 1951)
 Brachypnoea paraensis Bechyné & Bechyne, 1961
 Brachypnoea peregrina (Lefèvre, 1878)
 Brachypnoea phryna (Bechyné, 1953)
 Brachypnoea piccolina Bechyné & Bechyné, 1964
 Brachypnoea placida (Jacoby, 1890)
 Brachypnoea plumbea (Jacoby, 1890)
 Brachypnoea puncticollis (Say, 1824) (rose leaf beetle)
 Brachypnoea pustulata (Harold, 1874)
 Brachypnoea rotundicollis (Schaeffer, 1906)
 Brachypnoea ruficornis (Lefèvre, 1885)
 Brachypnoea rufipes (Lefèvre, 1878)
 Brachypnoea rufula (Weise, 1921)
 Brachypnoea scheerpeltzi (Bechyné, 1955)
 Brachypnoea scutellaris (Lefèvre, 1878)
 Brachypnoea secondaria (Bechyné, 1951)
 Brachypnoea secondaria secondaria (Bechyné, 1951)
 Brachypnoea secondaria sculptithorax (Bechyné, 1953)
 Brachypnoea selenaria (Bechyné, 1951)
 Brachypnoea semicostata (Lefèvre, 1875)
 Brachypnoea seminigra (Lefèvre, 1891)
 Brachypnoea sermyla (Bechyné, 1955)
 Brachypnoea sinuata (Jacoby, 1890)
 Brachypnoea sophia Bechyné & Bechyné, 1964
 Brachypnoea spinulosa (Lefèvre, 1885)
 Brachypnoea strangulata (Bechyné, 1951)
 Brachypnoea subaenea (Jacoby, 1899)
 Brachypnoea subcylindrica (Jacoby, 1881)
 Brachypnoea sylvana (Bechyné, 1953)
 Brachypnoea tarsata (Jacoby, 1881)
 Brachypnoea texana (Schaeffer, 1919)
 Brachypnoea theobromae (Bryant, 1924)
 Brachypnoea tricostulata (Lefèvre, 1875)
 Brachypnoea tristis (Olivier, 1808)
 Brachypnoea unicostata (Jacoby, 1881)
 Brachypnoea varicornis (Weise, 1921)
 Brachypnoea venustula (Lefèvre, 1878)
 Brachypnoea violaceipennis (Jacoby, 1878)
 Brachypnoea virginia (Bechyné, 1955)
 Brachypnoea virgulata (Lefèvre, 1878)
 Brachypnoea viridis (Jacoby, 1878)
 Brachypnoea vulnerata Bechyné & Bechyne, 1961
 Brachypnoea wanda (Bechyné, 1954)
 Brachypnoea weyrauchi (Bechyné, 1955)
 Brachypnoea winkerli (Lefèvre, 1878)
 Brachypnoea wygodzinskyi (Bechyné, 1949)
 Brachypnoea zita (Bechyné, 1954)

Species moved to Dryadomolpus:
 Brachypnoea brevis (Lefèvre, 1889) (originally in Alethaxius)
 Brachypnoea ella (Bechyné, 1955)
 Brachypnoea simoni (Lefèvre, 1889)
 Brachypnoea singularis (Lefèvre, 1889)
 Brachypnoea trichophora (Bechyné, 1955)

Species moved to other genera:
 Brachypnoea cupriceps (Lefèvre, 1877): moved to Chrysodinopsis
 Brachypnoea minuta (Jacoby, 1881): moved to Spintherophyta

Synonyms:
 Brachypnoea chrysicollis (Weise, 1921): Synonym of Brachypnoea aurulenta (Lefèvre, 1876)
 Brachypnoea coeruleata (Jacoby, 1899): Synonym of Brachypnoea venustula (Lefèvre, 1878)
 Brachypnoea granosa (Lefèvre, 1885): Synonym of Brachypnoea nana (Klug, 1829)
 Brachypnoea purpureosericea (Bechyné, 1951): Synonym of Brachypnoea aurulenta (Lefèvre, 1876)
 Brachypnoea venezuelensis (Jacoby, 1899): Synonym of Brachypnoea humeralis (Latreille, 1833)

Gallery

References

Further reading

 
 
 

Eumolpinae
Chrysomelidae genera
Articles created by Qbugbot
Beetles of North America
Beetles of South America
Taxa named by Johannes von Nepomuk Franz Xaver Gistel